Doctor Aybolit is a 1938 Soviet live-action family film directed by Vladimir Nemolyayev.

Plot 
The film is based on the eponymous book by Korney Chukovsky. Aibolit meets a little boy and decides to help him.

Starring 
 Maksim Shtraukh as Dr. Aibolit
 Anna Semionovna as Varvara (as A. Vilyams)
 Igor Arkadin as Benalis
 Yevgeni Gurov
 Aleksandr Timontayev as Robber
 Iona Biy-Brodskiy as Robber (as I. Bii-Brodsky)
 Pyotr Galadzhev as Robber (as P. Galadjev)
 Emmanuil Geller as Robber
 Viktor Seleznyov

References

External links 

1938 films
1930s Russian-language films
Soviet black-and-white films
Films based on fairy tales